Gardaab is 2016 Pakistani drama film directed by Harune Massey, written by Harune Massey, Saleemullah Nasir and produced by Mazhar Zaidi under the production banner of Matteela Films. The film features Fawad Khan and Amna Ilyas in the main cast. It also features Gohar Rasheed, Nimra Bucha, Adnan Shah Tipu, Mohammad Javed and Khalid Ahmed.

Cast 
 Fawad Khan as Shahbaz
 Amna Ilyas as Parveen
 Gohar Rasheed as Yousaf
 Adnan Shah Tipu as Maywa Jaan
 Nimra Bucha
 Mohammed Javed as Akmal
 Khalid Ahmed as Firdous Khan
 Shama Askari as Miss Christina
 Arif Hassan as Abdullah Jaan
 Gule Rana as Mother

Production 
Whilst speaking to Express Tribune Producer Mazhar Zaidi; revealed that the film was about a serious love story which was set against the backgrounds of Karachi, which has fall in a lot of turmoil.
Director Harune Massey originally had planned to make a short film but due to the scale of the subject matter the film was turned into a feature-length romantic thriller. The film production began in 2015. Fawad Khan revealed about plot of the film that it is a loose adaptation of Romeo and Juliet.

See also
List of Pakistani films of 2016

http://tns.thenews.com.pk/binge-watching-desi-films/#.WTxAUuvyvIV

References

External links 
 
 

Pakistani drama films
2016 films
2010s Urdu-language films
2016 drama films